Flemming Mark Pedersen is a Danish-Norwegian competitive shooter who won the 1992 IPSC European Handgun Championship and 1985 IPSC Nordic Handgun Championship. He is also 10 times IPSC Norwegian Handgun Champion and 2 times IPSC Norwegian Rifle Champion.

References 
 DSSN Hall of Fame
 TriggerFreeze.com - IPSC Rifle Norway

1958 births
Living people
IPSC shooters
Norwegian male sport shooters
Place of birth missing (living people)